The 1930 St. Louis Cardinals season was the team's 49th season in St. Louis, Missouri and the 39th season in the National League. The Cardinals went 92–62 during the season and finished first in the National League. In the 1930 World Series, they lost to the Philadelphia Athletics in six games.

Regular season
In the 1930 season, every Cardinals player with over 300 at bats had a batting average over .300, the only time in history this has happened.

Season standings

Record vs. opponents

Roster

Player stats

Batting

Starters by position
Note: Pos = Position; G = Games played; AB = At bats; H = Hits; Avg. = Batting average; HR = Home runs; RBI = Runs batted in

Other batters
Note: G = Games played; AB = At bats; H = Hits; Avg. = Batting average; HR = Home runs; RBI = Runs batted in

Pitching

Starting pitchers
Note: G = Games pitched; IP = Innings pitched; W = Wins; L = Losses; ERA = Earned run average; SO = Strikeouts

Other pitchers
Note: G = Games pitched; IP = Innings pitched; W = Wins; L = Losses; ERA = Earned run average; SO = Strikeouts

Relief pitchers
Note: G = Games pitched; W = Wins; L = Losses; SV = Saves; ERA = Earned run average; SO = Strikeouts

1930 World Series 

AL Philadelphia Athletics (4) vs. NL St. Louis Cardinals (2)

Farm system

LEAGUE CHAMPIONS: Rochester

References

External links
1930 St. Louis Cardinals at Baseball Reference
1930 St. Louis Cardinals  at Baseball Almanac

St. Louis Cardinals seasons
Saint Louis Cardinals season
National League champion seasons
St Louis Cardinals